Sarpac is a French made recoilless individual  diameter anti-tank and assault rocket weapon.

The Sarpac was developed by the company Hotchkiss-Brandt, and was designed mostly as an anti-tank weapon, but it is also useful against fortified positions built of concrete. The Sarpac comprises a launcher that can fire 68mm high-explosive anti-tank (HEAT) dual-purpose anti-personnel weapon or illuminating rocket projectiles. Due to the size and weight of general purpose round, there is almost double the effective range of the anti-tank round. The launcher consists of two telescoping tube sections with the inner one extending forward, a trigger mechanism, a sighting unit, a folding shoulder support and a strap for carrying. The sighting mechanism while considered unusual, is robust and has the shape of a parallelogram when in firing position. On the front of the sight there is both a ranging scale and a grid which enables the operator to fire at moving targets. The projectile is fin stabilized with eight forward folding fins which lock into position after leaving the tube. The rocket motor burns fully before leaving the tube, to avoid injuring the gunner. The Sarpac launcher weighs approximately  empty and was originally meant to be disposable, however tests showed that the improved launcher introduced later could be reused for up to 20 firings. Though developed and manufactured in France, the Sarpac was never adopted by the French Army. Instead, it was exported to several countries. The unit cost of the projectile and launcher is reported to be very low.

The Sarpac is no longer produced, is considered obsolete, and no longer in service with Finland or Malaysia.

Ammunition
ROCHAP HEAP – dual purpose round with both an anti-personnel and light anti-armour warhead, effective range 700 meters, weight 1.8 kg
ROCHAR HEAT – HEAT round, effective range 200 meters, weight 1.09 kg
ROCLAIR ILLUM – illumination round, range 765 meters (fired at a slant into the air), weight 1.3 kg, burn time 30 seconds

Notes

References

Anti-tank rockets
Weapons of France
Weapons of Finland